Corey Miller may refer to:
Corey Miller (American football) (born 1968), American football player
Corey Miller (tattoo artist) (born 1967), American tattoo artist and television personality
C-Murder (born 1971 as Corey Miller), American rapper and convicted murderer

See also
 Cory Miller (born 1988), American soccer player